Marat Alimzhanovich Basharov (born 22 August 1974) is a Soviet and Russian film actor and a TV host, of Volga Tatar origin.

He has appeared in 30 films since 1994. He starred in the film The Wedding, which was entered into the 2000 Cannes Film Festival.

Biography
Marat was born in Moscow to a working class Volga Tatar family. After high school, he was enrolled in Moscow State University, Faculty of Law. However, pursuing an acting career, he soon dropped out and went to the M.S. Schepkin Higher Theatre School instead.

Marat has a daughter (born Sep 2004), named Ameli. In October 2014, Basharov beat his second wife, Katherine Arkharova, and kicked her out of the apartment. Arkharova spent some time in a coma. Doctors diagnosed her with nose fracture, traumatic brain injury and bruising. Later, the actress was discharged from the hospital and moved out.

Sanctions 
In February 2023 Canada sanctioned Marat Basharov for being involved in Russian propaganda and spreading misinformation relating to the 2022 war in Ukraine.

Selected filmography

 The Barber of Siberia (1998)
 The Wedding (2000)
 Tycoon (2002)
 The Turkish Gambit (2005)
 The Fall of the Empire (2005)
 Dikari (2006)
 Konservy (2007)
 1612 (2007)
 Yulenka (2009)
 Attack on Leningrad (2009)
 In the Style of Jazz (2010)
 Office Romance. Our Time (2011)
 Rzhevsky versus Napoleon (2012)
 Battalion (2015)
 The Heritage of Love (2016)

References

External links

1974 births
Living people
Russian male film actors
20th-century Russian male actors
21st-century Russian male actors
State Prize of the Russian Federation laureates
Russian male television actors
Tatar people of Russia
Male actors from Moscow